The 2019 Spelthorne Borough Council election took place on 2 May 2019 to elect all members of Spelthorne Borough Council in England. The Conservatives retained control of the council, but with a reduced majority of 7, down from 31.

Summary

Election result

|-

Results by Ward

Ashford Common

Ashford East

Ashford North and Stanwell South

Ashford Town

Halliford and Sunbury West

Laleham and Shepperton Green

Riverside and Laleham

Shepperton Town

Staines

Staines South

Stanwell North

Sunbury Common

Ian Beardsmore was elected as a Liberal Democrat in 2015.

Sunbury East

By-elections

Staines South

The resignation of independent councillor Nichola Cornes (elected as a Liberal Democrat) on 25 January 2021 led to the Staines South by-election, held 6 May 2021, to coincide with the Surrey County Council elections 2021.

Staines

The resignation of Green Party councillor Jan Doerfel on 7 June 2021 led to the Staines by-election, held 22 July 2021.

Stanwell North

The resignation of Conservative Party councillor Jim McIlroy on 31 December 2021 led to the Stanwell North by-election, held 23 February 2022.

Laleham and Shepperton Green

Laleham and Shepperton Green

References 

Spelthorne
Spelthorne Borough Council elections